Daniel Trubač (born 17 July 1997) is a professional Czech football midfielder currently playing for FK Teplice in the Czech First League.

He made his senior league debut for Hradec Králové on 17 August 2014 in a Czech First League 4–0 loss at Plzeň. He scored his first goal on 9 May 2015 in Hradec Králové's Czech First League 1–0 home win against Ostrava. After Hradec's relegation to the National Football League at the end of the 2016–17 season, Trubač joined Slavia Prague for an undisclosed fee and immediately went on a season-long loan to Teplice.

In February 2019, he signed a contract with FK Teplice.

References

External links 
 
 Daniel Trubač official international statistics
 

Czech footballers
Czech Republic youth international footballers
1997 births
Living people
Czech First League players
FC Hradec Králové players
SK Slavia Prague players
FK Teplice players
Association football midfielders
People from Opočno
Sportspeople from the Hradec Králové Region